was a Japanese architect noted for projects such as the Komazawa Olympic Gymnasium (1964) and the Sony Building (1966).

Education and career
Ashihara was educated at both the University of Tokyo and Harvard University. After graduating from Harvard in 1953 with a master's degree in Architecture, Ashihara worked in the architectural practice of modernist Marcel Breuer. Founder of his own firm Yoshinobu Ashihara Architecture Associates in 1956.

In the later stages of his career, he was appointed Professor of Architecture at the University of Tokyo. President of the Japan Institute of Architects from 1980 - 1982 and the Architectural Institute of Japan from 1985 - 1987.

He was the recipient of both the Order of the Sacred Treasure and the Order of Culture.

Projects

Publications
Ashihara published a large number of architecture focused studies and texts, most prominent being The Aesthetic Townscape (Japanese first edition 1979 and English translation in 1983) and the Hidden Order: Tokyo through the Twentieth Century (Japanese first edition 1986, English translation in 1989).

See also
 List of Important Cultural Properties of Japan (Shōwa period: structures)

References

External links

 Yoshinobu Ashihara Digital Forum

1918 births
2003 deaths
Japanese architects
University of Tokyo alumni
People from Tokyo
Harvard Graduate School of Design alumni